Min Ran Aung (also known as Noori Shah; 1485–1494) was king of Arakan for six months in 1494. The eldest son of King Dawlya was only 8 when he was put on the throne by the ministers after his granduncle King Ba Saw Nyo's death. The ministers also married the young boy to Saw Shin Saw, daughter of Ba Saw Nyo and his cousin. Still a child, the king had no interest in governing and spent much of the time playing. However, the ministers' belief that they could control the boy king was greatly shaken when the young king on a whim had one of the ministers drowned in a well. Concerned by the erratic behavior and for their own safety, the remaining ministers beheaded the king and handed the throne to his maternal uncle Salingathu.

During his short reign, the young king commissioned the construction of Htupayon Pagoda in the northern sector of Mrauk-U. The pagoda was considered auspicious by later Mrauk-U kings who visited its precincts after the coronation ceremony to take an oath for the well being of the country during their reign.

References

Bibliography
 
 

Monarchs of Mrauk-U
1485 births
1494 deaths
15th century in Burma
15th-century Burmese monarchs